Kalgali is a village Washuk District, in the northern part of Balochistan province of Pakistan.

Populated places in Balochistan, Pakistan
Washuk District